Florya railway station is a railway station in Bakırköy, Istanbul. The station was built in 1955 as a stop on the Istanbul suburban commuter rail line until 2013, when the entire line was closed down for expansion and renovation. Florya station was demolished and rebuilt in order to accommodate for a third track. The new station entered service in the beginning of 2019 and became a stop on the Marmaray commuter rail line.

The station was used by the public to access the Florya beach, a popular city beach in Istanbul.

References

Railway stations in Istanbul Province
Railway stations opened in 1955
1955 establishments in Turkey
Bakırköy
Marmaray